2017 ACC tournament may refer to:

 2017 ACC men's basketball tournament
 2017 ACC women's basketball tournament
 2017 ACC men's soccer tournament
 2017 ACC women's soccer tournament
 2017 Atlantic Coast Conference baseball tournament
 2017 Atlantic Coast Conference softball tournament